Eurostar Italia was the name given to high-speed trains operated by Trenitalia in Italy. The brand was discontinued and replaced with Le Frecce in December 2012.

History
The category Eurostar, introduced in 1997, replaced the Pendolino trains and had always been for the route connecting Milan to Rome and its extensions. Since 2006 with the opening of the high speed lines the category gradually declined in several subcategories and the original gradually downsized. 

In June 2012, the category Eurostar was divided into various subcategories indicating various high-speed services. The new categories created were Frecciarossa for the fastest trains, Frecciargento for the next category of trains, and Frecciabianca. The final Eurostar services connecting Rome with Ravenna and Reggio Calabria operated until December 2012.

The name Eurostar was used under license from Iveco, which owns the trademark and used the name for one of their trucks. Despite the identical name, there is no relation between this service and the Eurostar railway service that runs through the Channel Tunnel.

Services
Various categories used until June 2012 were:

 Eurostar Alta Velocità Frecciarossa (Turin-Milan-Florence-Rome-Naples), now only Frecciarossa
 Eurostar Alta Velocità Frecciargento (Rome-Venice, Rome-Reggio Calabria, Rome-Lecce), now only Frecciargento
 Eurostar City Italia Frecciabianca, now only Frecciabianca
 Eurostar Italia Business, discontinued after opening high-speed line Milan-Rome
 Eurostar Italia Alta Velocità Fast, now included in Frecciarossa and Frecciargento 
 Eurostar Italia Fast, now included in Frecciarossa and Frecciargento

The trains
 ETR 460 (Eurostar service).

The lines

See also
Treno Alta Velocità
Trenitalia
Rete Ferroviaria Italiana
ElettroTreno
Pendolino
New Pendolino
Train categories in Europe

References

External links
Eurostar Italia 

High-speed rail in Italy
Ferrovie dello Stato Italiane
Articles containing video clips